The 2017 Open 13 Provence was a men's tennis tournament played on indoor hard courts. It was the 24th edition of the Open 13, and part of the ATP World Tour 250 series of the 2017 ATP World Tour. It took place at the Palais des Sports in Marseille, France, from 20 February through 26 February 2017. Second-seeded Jo-Wilfried Tsonga won the singles title.

Points and prize money

Point distribution

Prize money

Singles main-draw entrants

Seeds 

 Rankings are as of February 13, 2017.

Other entrants 
The following players received wildcards into the main draw:
 Julien Benneteau 
 Denis Shapovalov 
 Stefanos Tsitsipas

The following players received entry from the qualifying draw:
 Evgeny Donskoy 
 Norbert Gombos 
 Andrey Rublev
 Sergiy Stakhovsky

Withdrawals 
Before the tournament
 Grigor Dimitrov →replaced by  Jérémy Chardy
 Mischa Zverev →replaced by  Paul-Henri Mathieu

Doubles main-draw entrants

Seeds 

1 Rankings are as of February 13, 2017.

Other entrants 
The following pairs received wildcards into the main draw:
  Nick Kyrgios /  Matt Reid 
  Lucas Miedler /  Maximilian Neuchrist

The following pair received entry as alternates:
  Maxime Chazal /  David Guez

Finals

Singles 

  Jo-Wilfried Tsonga defeated  Lucas Pouille, 6–4, 6–4

Doubles 

  Julien Benneteau /  Nicolas Mahut defeated  Robin Haase /  Dominic Inglot, 6–4, 6–7(9–11), [10–5]

References

External links 
Official website

Open 13 Provence
Open 13